The following is a list of historically significant college football games. Games included on this list are single college football games that have historical impact to the sport of college football.

Inclusion on this list requires games of significant historical "firsts" and/or otherwise significant impact to the sport itself, such as significant rules changes or initiation of long-standing ceremony. Historically significant games should be prominently discussed in major historical accounts of college football. Games that may be significant only to a particular team's fan base should not be listed here.

Games are listed in chronological order.  The name of the winning team is in bold.

See also
History of American football
Game of the Century (college football)
AP Poll#No. 1 vs. No. 2
List of NCAA college football rivalry games
List of college bowl games
College football on television
College Football Hall of Fame
List of NCAA football records
Bowl Championship Series
List of NCAA conferences
List of college athletic conferences in the United States
List of the first college football game in each US state

Footnotes

References

College football games